Aïn El Ibil District is a district of Djelfa Province, Algeria.

The district is further divided into 4 municipalities:
Aïn El Ibel
Mouadjebara
Tadmit
Zaccar

Districts of Djelfa Province